The second season of the television comedy series The Middle aired between September 22, 2010 and May 25, 2011, on ABC in the United States. It was produced by Blackie and Blondie Productions and Warner Bros. Television with series creators DeAnn Heline and Eileen Heisler as executive producers. 

The show features Frances "Frankie" Heck (Patricia Heaton), a working-class, Midwestern woman married to Mike Heck (Neil Flynn) who resides in the small fictional town of Orson, Indiana. They are the parents of three children, Axl (Charlie McDermott), Sue (Eden Sher), and Brick (Atticus Shaffer).

Cast

Main cast
 Patricia Heaton as Frankie Heck
 Neil Flynn as Mike Heck
 Charlie McDermott as Axl Heck
 Eden Sher as Sue Heck
 Atticus Shaffer as Brick Heck
 Chris Kattan as Bob

Recurring cast
 Brock Ciarlelli as Brad, Sue's ex-boyfriend
 Blaine Saunders as Carly, Sue's best friend
 Jen Ray as Nancy Donahue, the Hecks' neighbor
 Beau Wirick as Sean Donahue, Axl's friend
 Brian Doyle-Murray as Don Elhert, owner of the car dealership where Frankie and Bob work
 John Gammon as Darrin, Axl's friend

Guest cast
 Doris Roberts as Mrs. Rinsky, Brick's third grade teacher ("Back to School", "The Math Class", "Back to Summer").
 Matthew Moy as Takayuki, a foreign exchange student from Japan ("Foreign Exchange").
 Sarah Wright as Kasey, Axl's new manager at the movie theater ("A Birthday Story").
 Norm Macdonald as Rusty Heck, Mike's brother ("Thanksgiving II").
 John Cullum as "Big" Mike Heck, Sr., Mike's father ("Thanksgiving II").
 Marsha Mason as Pat Spence, Frankie's mother ("A Simple Christmas").
 Jerry Van Dyke as Tag Spence, Frankie's father ("A Simple Christmas").
 Mary-Pat Green as Mrs. Larimer, the principal of Orson Elementary ("The Math Class").

Episodes

Ratings

References

The Middle (TV series)
2010 American television seasons
2011 American television seasons